Kenilworth is a British television series which aired in 1957 on the BBC Television Service. An adaptation of the 1821 novel of the same title by Sir Walter Scott, it consisted of six 30-minute episodes. The series is missing and believed to be lost. It was a historical drama set during the reign of Elizabeth I and portraying several well-known figures from the era.

The cast included Paul Eddington, Anthony Newlands, Ann Firbank and Robin Bailey.

References

External links

1950s British television miniseries
1950s British drama television series
1957 British television series debuts
1957 British television series endings
BBC television dramas
Black-and-white British television shows
Lost BBC episodes